Porto Seguro Airport  is the airport serving Porto Seguro, Brazil. It is operated by Sinart.

History
The airport was commissioned in 1982 but in 1997 brand new passenger terminal and apron were opened.

Porto Seguro is one of the most popular destinations in Brazil served mainly by seasonal and charter flights.

Airlines and destinations

Access

See also

List of airports in Brazil

References

External links

Airports in Bahia
Airports established in 1982
1982 establishments in Brazil